Best Actress in a Leading Role is a British Academy Film Award presented annually by the British Academy of Film and Television Arts (BAFTA) to recognize an actress who has delivered an outstanding leading performance in a film.

 From 1952 to 1967, there were two Best Actress awards presented, Best British Actress and Best Foreign Actress.
 From 1968 onwards, the two awards merged into one award, which from 1968 to 1984 was known as Best Actress.
 From 1985 to present, the award has been known by its current name of Best Actress in a Leading Role.

Winners and nominees

Best British Actress (1952–1967)

Best Foreign Actress (1952–1967)

Best Actress in a Leading Role (1968–present)

1968–1979

1980s

1990s

2000s

2010s

2020s

Note: Between 1964 and 1973, several actresses were nominated for multiple performances in a single year, these each count as one nomination. Scarlett Johansson's two mentions in 2003 count as two separate nominations. The two mentions received by Kate Winslet in both 2004 and 2008 count as two separate nominations each time.

Note: The 2013 ceremony was the first time in the history of BAFTA that two French actresses were nominated for French-language performances in this category: Marion Cotillard for Rust and Bone and Emmanuelle Riva for Amour; the latter won.

Superlatives

Note: Meryl Streep and Judi Dench tie for the record of a total of 15 BAFTA Film nominations, with Streep having 12 Best Actress nominations and 3 Best Supporting Actress nominations. Dench has 5 Best Actress nominations and 9 Best Supporting Actress nominations. Dench's 15th nomination is for Best Newcomer in 1966 (which she won). This gives her 6 BAFTA Film wins. In addition, she has won 4 BAFTA TV awards (from 12 nominations). In total, she has received 27 BAFTA Film & TV nominations with 10 wins. In 2001, Dench also received an honorary BAFTA: The BAFTA Fellowship.

Note: Maggie Smith has a total of 13 BAFTA Film nominations, for Best Actress (8), Best Supporting Actress (4) and Best Newcomer (1), winning 5. She also has 5 BAFTA TV nominations. This gives her a total of 18 BAFTA Film and TV nominations. In addition, Smith has received two honorary awards: The BAFTA Special Award (1993) and BAFTA Fellowship (1996).

Multiple nominations
12 nominations
 Meryl Streep

8 nominations
 Maggie Smith

7 nominations

 Anne Bancroft
 Shirley MacLaine

6 nominations

 Julie Christie
 Jane Fonda
 Simone Signoret

5 nominations

 Cate Blanchett
 Judi Dench
 Audrey Hepburn
 Katharine Hepburn
 Emma Thompson
 Kate Winslet

4 nominations

 Deborah Kerr
 Helen Mirren
 Saoirse Ronan
 Joanne Woodward

3 nominations

 Amy Adams
 Stéphane Audran
 Annette Bening
 Viola Davis
 Edith Evans
 Mia Farrow
 Ava Gardner
 Glenda Jackson
 Scarlett Johansson
 Diane Keaton
 Nicole Kidman
 Frances McDormand
 Sarah Miles
 Julianne Moore
 Sissy Spacek
 Elizabeth Taylor
 Charlize Theron
 Emily Watson
 Renée Zellweger

2 nominations

 Anouk Aimée
 Julie Andrews
 Peggy Ashcroft
 Leslie Caron
 Glenn Close
 Marion Cotillard
 Judy Davis
 Faye Dunaway
 Jodie Foster
 Lady Gaga
 Goldie Hawn
 Susan Hayward
 Judy Holliday
 Celia Johnson
 Grace Kelly
 Anna Magnani
 Giulietta Masina
 Virginia McKenna
 Melina Mercouri
 Hayley Mills
 Yvonne Mitchell
 Marilyn Monroe
 Jeanne Moreau
 Patricia Neal
 Natalie Portman
 Emmanuelle Riva
 Julia Roberts
 Rachel Roberts
 Susan Sarandon
 Maria Schell
 Kristin Scott Thomas
 Jean Simmons
 Barbra Streisand
 Sylvia Syms
 Jessica Tandy
 Audrey Tautou
 Uma Thurman
 Rita Tushingham
 Liv Ullmann
 Julie Walters
 Reese Witherspoon
 Michelle Yeoh
 Ziyi Zhang

Multiple wins

4 wins
 Maggie Smith

3 wins
 Anne Bancroft
 Cate Blanchett
 Audrey Hepburn
 Simone Signoret

2 wins
 Leslie Caron
 Judi Dench
 Jane Fonda
 Katharine Hepburn
 Shirley MacLaine
 Frances McDormand
 Patricia Neal
 Rachel Roberts
 Meryl Streep
 Emma Thompson

See also
 Academy Award for Best Actress
 Critics' Choice Movie Award for Best Actress
 Independent Spirit Award for Best Female Lead
 Golden Globe Award for Best Actress in a Motion Picture – Drama
 Golden Globe Award for Best Actress – Motion Picture Comedy or Musical
 BIFA Award for Best Performance by an Actress in a British Independent Film
 Screen Actors Guild Award for Outstanding Performance by a Female Actor in a Leading Role

References

External links
 BAFTA Awards Database

British Academy Film Awards
 
Film awards for lead actress